Insision is a death metal band from Stockholm, Sweden. They are currently signed to Sevared Records.

Biography
Insision is a Swedish brutal death metal band with a non-Swedish sound. Drawing inspirations from Cryptopsy, Morbid Angel, Cannibal Corpse and Deicide, the group is better associated with death metal from North America.

They have released four albums, Beneath The Folds of Flesh (2002), Revealed and Worshipped (2004), Ikon (2007) and Terminal Reckoning (2016). Beside those, they have released three demos titled "Meant to Suffer" (1997), "Promo 2000" (2000) and "Revelation of the SadoGod" (2001). They did a split with Inveracity called "Revelation of the SadoGod" in 2001. The Insision part is also the aforementioned "Revelation of the SadoGod" demo. They have made two EPs The Dead Live On (1999) and End Of All (2011).

The labels that have worked with Insision are Heathendoom Records Sweden, Earache Records UK, Dental Records Sweden, and Sevared Records USA.

In December 2010, Insision signed with the US based "Sevared Records". Insision Recorded the EP End Of All, released in (2011). Sevared Records released the Insision compilation album, 15 Years Of Exaggerated Torment (2012). Terminal Reckoning was released by Sevared Records (2016).

Members
 Carl Birath - vocals
 Roger Tobias Johansson - guitar
 Gustav Trodin - bass

Past members
 Ibrahim Stråhlman Drums (session) (2015)
 Adam Ramis guitar (2011–2014)
 Marcus Dalmanner bass (2005–2014)
 Joel Andersson bass (2010–2014)
 Magnus Martinsson guitar (2007–2010)
 Daniel Ekeroth bass (2000–2009)
 Thomas Daun - drums [Still on Revealed and Worshipped] (1997–2004)
 Toob Brynedahl - guitar [Still on Revealed and Worshipped] (2001–2004)
 Joonas Ahonen - guitar (1997–2000)
 Janne Hyytia - bass (1999 only)
 Johan Thornberg - vocals (1997–1999)
 Daniel Sommerfeldt bass (1997–1999)
 Christian Eriksson - live guitar on Scandinavian tours (2005)

Discography
 Meant to Suffer (1997, Demo)
 Live Like a Worm (1998, Demo)
 The Dead Live On (1999, EP)
 Promo 2000 (2000, Demo)
 Supreme Brutal Legions (2000, split w/ various artists)
 Insision / Inveracity (2001, Split with Inveracity. The Insision part is basically the same as "Revelation of the SadoGod.)
 Revelation of the Sadogod (2001, Demo)
 Beneath the Folds of Flesh (2002, Album)
 Revealed and Worshipped (2004, Album)
 Ikon (September 26, 2007, Album)
 End of All (June 1, 2011, EP)
 15 Years of Exaggerated Torment (May 25, 2012, compilation)
 Terminal Reckoning (2016, Album)

References

External links
Official website
Insision endorser presentation by a German instrument builder

Swedish death metal musical groups
Swedish musical groups
Musical groups established in 1997
Earache Records artists